Gentleness is a personal quality which can be part of one's character. It consists in kindness, consideration and amiability.

Aristotle used it in a technical sense as the virtue that strikes the mean with regard to anger: being too quick to anger is a vice, but so is being detached in a situation where anger is appropriate; justified and properly focused anger is named mildness or gentleness. 

Gentleness is not passive; it requires a resistance to brutality. Gentleness does not submit to tyranny, but it responds with a tender awareness of others’ experiences and pain.

Bryant McGil suggested we act with gentleness when we release ourselves from our wants and want from others, such as wanting others to mind read us, have their attention, expecting continued agreement and always pleasing us; “When you focus on want, you become an endless cycle of wants. To get, simply release, and then gently invite.”. We feel we know more about what we like about our partner, and make effort to know more about it.

A second important usage was common in medieval times, associated with higher social classes: hence the derivation of the terms gentleman, gentlewoman and gentry. The broadening of gentle behavior from a literal sense of the gentry to the metaphorical "like a gentleman" applicable to any person was a later development.

Most recently, the late philosopher and psychoanalyst Anne Dufourmantelle wrote in her book, "Power of Gentleness", that Gentleness was, above all other things, a force of potentiality. Gentleness, she argued: "Is an enigma. It is taken up in the double movement of welcoming and giving, it appears on the threshold of passages signed off by birth and death. Because it has its degrees of intensity, because it is a symbolic force, and because it has a transformative ability over things and beings, it is a power."

See also
 Agreeableness

External links

Personality traits
Moral psychology
Fruit of the Holy Spirit
Virtue